"My Own Sunrise" is a song by Canadian group Crash Test Dummies and was the second and last single from their 1996 album A Worm's Life.

Music video

The music video for the song features the band dressed in suits and top hats singing in a world filled with many ladders.

Charts

1997 singles
Crash Test Dummies songs
Songs written by Brad Roberts